Ladzany is a village and municipality in the Krupina District of the Banská Bystrica Region of Slovakia.

See also
 List of municipalities and towns in Slovakia

References

External links
 
 

Villages and municipalities in Krupina District